This is a list of regency and cities in Special Capital Region of Jakarta. As of October 2019, there were 1 administrative regency and 5 administrative cities.

External links 

Thousand Islands Regency
West Jakarta
Central Jakarta
South Jakarta
East Jakarta
North Jakarta
Regencies, Indonesia
Regencies and cities